The Legion is a 2020 Spanish-American action adventure film directed by Jose Magan, and featuring Mickey Rourke and Bai Ling. It is based on the war between Rome and Parthian Empire in Armenia from 58 to 63 AD.

It is Magán's directorial debut.

Cast
 Lee Partridge as Noreno, the half-Roman soldier
 Mickey Rourke as General Corbulo
 Bai Ling as Amirah, Corbulo's mistress
 Joaquim de Almeida as General Paetus
 Vladimir Kulich as Marcus 
 Bosco Hogan as Saul 
 Marta Castellvi as Duria
 Tristan McConnell as Nerses 
 Eric Higgins as Madyes
 Gavan Duffy as Saka
 Michael Redmond as Scyles 
 Mark Aaron as Valerius
 Ciaran O’Grady as Claudius
 Jinny Lofthouse
 Enrique Inchausti
 Richard Wilson

Release
The film was released in the United States on May 8, 2020 on video-on-demand and digital platforms.

Reception
Tara McNamara of Common Sense Media awarded the film one star out of five.

Frank Scheck of The Hollywood Reporter gave the film a negative review and wrote, "Director Magán displays no flair for action sequences, although the budgetary limitations obviously didn't help. Nor does he successfully pull off the dramatic scenes, including one in which Rourke delivers an anguished, tearful monologue that plays like a decades-old Actors Studio audition piece and nearly erases all memories of his sensitive work in such films as Diner and The Wrestler."

References

External links
 
 

American action adventure films
Spanish action adventure films
2020s English-language films
2020s Spanish-language films
Saban Films films
2020 directorial debut films
2020 films
Spanish multilingual films
American multilingual films
2020 action adventure films
2020 multilingual films
2020s American films